"I Need You" is a song written by David Lee and Tony Lane, and recorded by American country music artist Tim McGraw and his wife, Faith Hill as a duet. It was released in April 2007 as the second single from the album, Let It Go. The song peaked at number 8 on the country charts in August 2007, partly due to competition with individual singles from Hill and McGraw ("Lost" and "If You're Reading This", respectively).

The duet was nominated twice at the 2008 Grammy Awards for Best Country Collaboration with Vocals and Best Country Song.

Content
The song is a ballad, in which the two lovers describe what their love means to each other. They both state their need for each other.

Critical reception
Ken Tucker, of Billboard magazine in his review of the album, called the song "wonderfully different than the power ballads they usually do."

Music video
The music video, which features an acoustic version of this song, was directed and produced by Sherman Halsey, and premiered on CMT on June 12, 2007.

Chart positions
"I Need You" debuted at number 48 on the U.S. Billboard Hot Country Songs for the week of April 14, 2007.

Year-end charts

Certifications

Cover versions
Country music duo Steel Magnolia recorded a live version of the song, which is included in their 2010 extended play, Steel Magnolia — EP.

References

2007 singles
2007 songs
Tim McGraw songs
Faith Hill songs
Male–female vocal duets
Songs written by Tony Lane (songwriter)
Song recordings produced by Byron Gallimore
Song recordings produced by Tim McGraw
Curb Records singles
Music videos directed by Sherman Halsey
Country ballads
Songs written by David Lee (songwriter)